Cameron A. Morrison (October 5, 1869August 20, 1953) was an American politician and the 55th governor of the U.S. state of North Carolina from 1921 to 1925.

Early life and career
He was born in 1869 in Richmond County, North Carolina.

In 1898, Morrison participated in the Wilmington insurrection of 1898, a violent coup d'état by a group of white supremacists. They expelled opposition black and white political leaders from the city, destroyed the property and businesses of black citizens built up since the Civil War, including the only black newspaper in the city, and killed an estimated 60 to more than 300 people. The governor of North Carolina, Daniel Lindsay Russell, was forced to flee from Wilmington to Raleigh. Morrison boarded Russell's train in Maxton, North Carolina in the company of a small band of Red Shirts and warned Russell that a more hostile band of Red Shirts were waiting at a later stop. He advised Russell to hide in the baggage car to avoid being lynched, which he did.

In 1900, he was elected to the North Carolina Senate for one term.

Governorship
With the backing of Sen. Furnifold Simmons and the help of race-baiting tactics employed by A. D. Watts, Morrison defeated O. Max Gardner in the 1920 Democratic primary for governor. In the general election, he defeated Republican nominee John J. Parker.

He came to be called "the Good Roads governor" for his support of a modern highway system. Morrison also pushed for increased funds for public education, while also battling the teaching of the theory of evolution.

Later career
He was later appointed to serve as a United States senator for the state of North Carolina (after the death of Lee S. Overman) between 1930 and 1932, but lost his seat in the Democratic primary runoff to Robert R. Reynolds.

Morrison was later elected to one term in the United States House of Representatives from 1943 to 1945.  He again lost a Democratic primary for a U.S. Senate seat in 1944, to Clyde R. Hoey. He died in Quebec City in 1953.

Legacy
A ten-story residence hall on the campus of UNC-Chapel Hill is named in Morrison's honor. His home at Charlotte, Morrocroft, was listed on the National Register of Historic Places in 1983.

A library in Charlotte was named after Morrison, but was renamed in 2020 due to Morrison's ties with the Red Shirts and white supremacy. A residence hall at North Carolina A&T State University was also named after Morrison, but the name was removed in 2020.

References

External links

Cameron Morrison  at NCpedia

1869 births
1953 deaths
People from Rockingham, North Carolina
Democratic Party governors of North Carolina
Democratic Party North Carolina state senators
1916 United States presidential electors
North Carolina lawyers
Politicians from Charlotte, North Carolina
Democratic Party United States senators from North Carolina
Democratic Party members of the United States House of Representatives from North Carolina
Lawyers from Charlotte, North Carolina
20th-century American politicians
Wilmington insurrection of 1898
Neo-Confederates
American Christian creationists
Old Right (United States)